Reiver David Alvarenga Domínguez (born March 11, 1978) is a male judoka from Venezuela, who won the bronze medal in the men's extra lightweight division (– 60 kg) at the 2003 Pan American Games in Santo Domingo, Dominican Republic. He represented his native country in two consecutive Summer Olympics, starting in 2000.

References
 sports-reference

1978 births
Living people
Venezuelan male judoka
Judoka at the 2000 Summer Olympics
Judoka at the 2004 Summer Olympics
Judoka at the 2003 Pan American Games
Olympic judoka of Venezuela
Pan American Games bronze medalists for Venezuela
Pan American Games medalists in judo
Medalists at the 2003 Pan American Games
20th-century Venezuelan people
21st-century Venezuelan people